Lawal Kowawole “Kola” Abdulai (22 July 1947 – 30 July 2009) was a Nigerian sprinter. He competed in the 100 metres at the 1968 Summer Olympics and the 1972 Summer Olympics. Abdulai won a bronze medal in the 4 x 100 metres relay at the 1974 British Commonwealth Games.

References

External links
 

1947 births
2009 deaths
Athletes (track and field) at the 1968 Summer Olympics
Athletes (track and field) at the 1972 Summer Olympics
Nigerian male sprinters
Olympic athletes of Nigeria
Commonwealth Games bronze medallists for Nigeria
Commonwealth Games medallists in athletics
Athletes (track and field) at the 1970 British Commonwealth Games
Athletes (track and field) at the 1974 British Commonwealth Games
People from Zaria
Medallists at the 1974 British Commonwealth Games